The  men's moving target small-bore rifle was one of 15 events on the Shooting at the 1908 Summer Olympics programme. Regulation of the equipment used in the event was done through allowing the use of .22 LR or .297/.230 caliber ammunition. Magnifying and telescopic sights were prohibited. A hit on the upper two-thirds of the figure counted for 3 points, while any other hit counted for 1 point. 15 shots were fired per competitor. The maximum score was thus 45 points. Each nation could enter up to 12 shooters.

Results

References

Sources
 
 

Men's rifle small-bore individual moving